Evan Bevan Rees (9 August 1896 – 1978) was a Welsh rugby union, and professional rugby league footballer who played in the 1910s and 1920s. He played representative level rugby union (RU) for Wales, and at club level for Swansea RFC, as a centre, i.e. number 12 or 13, and club level rugby league (RL) for Dewsbury and Batley.

Background
Evan Rees was born in Cwmavon, or Bridgend, Wales, and he died aged 82 in Ogwr, Wales.

Playing career

International honours
Evan Rees won a cap for Wales (RU) while at Swansea RFC in 1914 against the New Zealand Army rugby team of 1919 (New Zealand Services).

Club career
Evan Rees did not play in Batley's 13–7 victory over Wigan in the 1923–24 Championship Final during the 1923–24 season, at The Cliff, Broughton, Salford on Saturday 3 May 1924, in front of a crowd of 13,729.

References

External links
Search for "Rees" at rugbyleagueproject.org
Team → Past Players → R at swansearfc.co.uk
Profile at swansearfc.co.uk

1896 births
1978 deaths
Batley Bulldogs players
Dewsbury Rams players
Rugby league players from Neath Port Talbot
Rugby union centres
Rugby union players from Cwmavon, Neath Port Talbot
Swansea RFC players
Wales international rugby union players
Welsh rugby league players
Welsh rugby union players